Tomb of Valdemar is a BBC Books original novel written by Simon Messingham and based on the long-running British science fiction television series Doctor Who. It features the Fourth Doctor, Romana I, and K-9.

Synopsis
Millennia ago, the great god Valdemar held sway over the universe. Somehow the Old Ones defeated this dark presence and entombed him beneath the acid skies of Ashkellia, before disappearing themselves forever.

Over the centuries, the myths of Valdemar grow, crossing solar systems and races. A novelist, Miranda Pelham, pieces together the Dark God's story. Unfortunately for her, revolution and the rise of a New Protectorate force her to strike an agreement with the decadent necromancer Paul Neville to find the lost Ashkellia.

The Doctor and Romana, despite their best efforts, become embroiled in the complex conspiracies and attempts to re-discover Valdemar. High in the boiling sulphuric acid clouds, in the Palace of the Old Ones, a place where reality and dreams collide, the way is being prepared for the resurrection of the Dark One.

The Doctor faces an agonising choice: should he continue with his quest to gather the segments of the Key to Time, or prevent the rebirth of a being so powerful that its release will alter the entire fabric of the universe?

References

2000 British novels
2000 science fiction novels
Past Doctor Adventures
Fourth Doctor novels
Novels by Simon Messingham
BBC Books books